Deflated Chime, Foals Slightly Flower Sibylline Responses is a limited edition tour-only EP by Elephant Six indie rock band of Montreal.  The EP contains two previously released songs, "Disconnect the Dots" from Satanic Panic in the Attic and "Wraith Pinned to the Mist (And Other Games)" from The Sunlandic Twins, and two new songs, "Psychotic Feeling" and "Noir Blues to Tinnitus."

After the EP's release, "Noir Blues to Tinnitus" was included as the b-side to "Voltaic Crusher/Undrum to Muted Da" from Suicide Squeeze and also appears on the 2012 of Montreal compilation album Daughter of Cloud. The single was sold by the band on their tour in support of The Sunlandic Twins.

Track listing
 "Wraith Pinned to the Mist (and Other Games)" - 4:07
 "Disconnect the Dots" - 4:25
 "Psychotic Feeling" - 3:03
 "Noir Blues to Tinnitus" - 5:26

2006 EPs
Of Montreal albums
Polyvinyl Record Co. EPs